Sport-Informations-Dienst GmbH (SID) (Sport Information Service) is a German news agency. Based in Cologne, it has grown to be a major sport news agency. It was founded on 15 September 1945. In 1998 the Sport-Informations-Dienst became a subsidiary of the Agence France-Presse.

References

External links
 Sport-Informations-Dienst Website

Companies based in Cologne
News agencies based in Germany
Mass media in Cologne